Mobarak Ali Pathan is an All India United Democratic Front politician from Assam. He was elected in Assam Legislative Assembly election in 2006 from Dhing constituency.

References 

Living people
All India United Democratic Front politicians
Assam MLAs 2006–2011
People from Nagaon district
Year of birth missing (living people)